August 15 is a 2011 Malayalam-language crime thriller film directed by Shaji Kailas, written by S. N. Swamy, and produced by M. Mani. It stars Mammootty, Meghana Raj, Nedumudi Venu, Siddique (actor), Sai Kumar, Shwetha Menon and Lalu Alex. 

The film is a sequel to the 1988 film August 1, which was directed by Sibi Malayil, and written by S. N. Swamy. 

August 15 was released on 24 March 2011 where it received negative reviews from critics and became a box-office bomb.

Premise 
On 15 August, DYSP Perumal of Crime Branch in Kerala, is assigned to investigate the assassination of V. G. Sadasivan, the Chief Minister of Kerala. Perumal realizes that Abraham, a cunning assassin who leaves no evidence, is behind the assassination and a cat-and-mouse begins with Perumal heading to capture Abraham.

Cast
 Mammootty as Perumal, DySP, Crime Branch
 Nedumudi Venu as V. G. Sadasivan, Chief Minister of Kerala
 Siddique as Abraham, a professional assassin
 Jagathy Sreekumar as Surendran, an aide at CM's residence
 Meghana Raj as Lakshmi, a cyber cell officer.
 Sai Kumar as Aravindakshan
 Shwetha Menon as Dr. Farida Hassan
 Lalu Alex as ADGP Peter Simon
 Balachandran Chullikkadu as Mukundan, political secretary to the chief minister
 Thalaivasal Vijay as DGP Krishnadas
 Pooja Batra as Devi Perumal
 Biju Pappan as DGP Sethumadhavan 
 Madhu as Dr. George
 Deepesh as Stephen, Perumal's assistant
 Aditya as Vinod
Ranjith as Kannan
 Kundara Johny as Rajeevan
 Chali Pala as Govindan
 Poojappura Ravi as Swami
Krishna
 Zeenath
 Harishree Ashokan as Chackochan
 Ambika Mohan as Ammini, V.G. Sadasivan's wife 
 Maya Moushmi as Dr. Usha
 Reshmi Boban as Nithya, Sadasivan's daughter
 Indulekha as Radhika, a journalist.

References

External links
Rediff Review

2011 films
2011 crime thriller films
2010s Malayalam-language films
Indian crime thriller films
Films about organised crime in India
Fictional portrayals of the Kerala Police
Films shot in Thiruvananthapuram
Indian sequel films
1August2
Films directed by Shaji Kailas